Our Lady of the Sacred Heart High School is a private Catholic high school in Moon Township, Pennsylvania. Located in the Roman Catholic Diocese of Pittsburgh, it is a ministry of the Felician Sisters. Among students and in colloquial terms, it is referred to as OLSH .

History
OLSH opened its doors in September 1932 to girls in the ninth and tenth grades. Some of the students studied to enter the sisterhood; others came from nearby communities. Eventually provisions were made for boarders as well. By the late sixties, the aspirancy and the boarding facilities were phased out and OLSH was ready to enter a new era.

In 1970, with the permission of the diocese of Pittsburgh and the approval of the administration of the Felician Sisters, the first boys were admitted to OLSH. The years that followed have seen a steady increase in numbers and in programs and activities for both young men and women at OLSH.

The 1979 Supreme Court decision upholding free transportation for non-public school students is significant in the history of the school in that it broadened the school's recruitment base. Currently students from 29 different school districts come together to form the OLSH community.

Location

Athletics

The OLSH Athletic Program offers twenty interscholastic sports teams for students.

Fall sports
 Girls Volleyball
 Girls Soccer
 Boys Soccer
 Girls & Boys Cross Country
 Golf
 Football
 Cheerleading

Winter sports
 Girls Basketball
 Boys Basketball
 Freshman Boys Basketball
 Girls & Boys Bowling
 Cheerleading
 Swimming (co-op with Cornell High School)
 Ice Hockey

Spring sports
 Boys Baseball
 Girls Softball
 Girls and Boys Track and Field
 Boys Volleyball

Internet radio broadcasts of many OLSH athletic contests are provided by The OLSH Sports Network. Football, boys and girls basketball, girls volleyball, baseball, boys soccer and softball games have been broadcast since the Network's inception in 2006-07. The games were previously streams through the MSA Sports Network and can be accessed at www.msasports.net. Currently the games are streamed at www.OLSHChargers.com

References

Educational institutions established in 1932
Catholic secondary schools in Pennsylvania
Education in Pittsburgh area
Schools in Allegheny County, Pennsylvania
1932 establishments in Pennsylvania